Kitay may refer to:

 Cathay, alternative English name for China
 David Kitay (born 1961), American film composer
 Kitay-gorod, business district in Moscow
 The New China (Osvobozhdyonnyy kitay), 1950 Soviet documentary

See also
 Kitai (disambiguation)